Comitas pseudoclarae is an extinct species of sea snail, a marine gastropod mollusc in the family Pseudomelatomidae.

Description

Distribution
This extinct marine species was found in Lower Miocene strata off Torquay, Victoria, Australia. The type specimen is in the Auckland Museum.

References

 A.W.B. Powell (1944), Records of the Auckland Institute and Museum., vol. 3 no. 1, p. 18, pi. 1, fig. 6.

External links
 Auckland Museum: Comitas pseudoclarae (holotype)

pseudoclarae
Gastropods described in 1944